C. J. Allen may refer to:

 C. J. Allen (sculptor) (1862–1956), British sculptor
 C. J. Allen (actor) (fl. 1982), British actor
 Cecil J. Allen (1886–1973), British railway engineer and writer
 C. J. Allen (fl. 1922), American actor

See also
Allen (surname)